JSW Energy Limited is an Indian power company engaged in power generation, transmission and trading. It is part of JSW Group.

In 2015, JSW Energy acquired two of Jaypee Group's hydropower plants, with a combined capacity of 1,391 MW, for 9,700 crore.

Operations
JSW Energy has 5,681 MW of operational generating capacity. In addition, it has power generation projects at an early stage under development with a proposed combined installed capacity of 8,630 MW.

Power plants
 JSW Vijayanagar Power Station, Toranagallu village in Bellary district, Karnataka. It is a 1460 MW (2x130,4x300 MW) plant.
 JSW Ratnagiri Power Station, Nandiwade village near Jaigad in Ratnagiri district, Maharashtra. It is a 1200 MW (4x300 MW) plant.
 JSW Barmer Power Station, Bhadresh village in Barmer district, Rajasthan. It is a 1080 MW (8x135 MW) plant.
Karcham Wangtoo Hydroelectric Plant, Kinnaur district, Himachal Pradesh. It is a 1,091 MW hydropower plant commissioned in 2011, acquired in 2015
 Baspa-II Hydroelectric Plant, Kinnaur district, Himachal Pradesh. It is a 300 MW hydropower plant which was commissioned in 2003, acquired in 2015

References

External links
 JSW Energy

JSW Group
Electric power companies of India
Companies based in Mumbai
Energy companies established in 1994
Indian companies established in 1994
JSW Energy
1994 establishments in Maharashtra
Companies listed on the National Stock Exchange of India
Companies listed on the Bombay Stock Exchange